Alban Sulejmani (born 14 April 1998) is a Macedonian footballer who currently plays as a winger for FK Pelister.

Club career

Early career
Sulejmani played with several clubs during his youth, including hometown club FK Milano Kumanovo, FK Rabotnički, and FK Makedonija Gjorče Petrov.

Renova
In 2015, Sulejmani moved to FK Renova in the Macedonian First Football League. He made his league debut for the club on 27 September 2015 in a 1-0 away loss to FK Metalurg Skopje. He was subbed on for Elmedin Redjepi in the 64th minute.

Legia Warsaw
In July 2016, Sulejmani was sold to Legia Warsaw on a free transfer. He trialed with the club, and they offered him a four-year contract. However, he spent his time with the reserve side, and never made a first team appearance.

Pogoń Siedlce (loan)
Later that same month, Sulejmani was loaned out to I Liga club MKP Pogoń Siedlce. He made his league debut for the club on 13 August 2016 in a 3-0 home loss to Sandecja Nowy Sącz. He was subbed on for Michał Bajdur in the 58th minute. He picked up a yellow card in the 75th minute of that match. Sulejmani would go on to make just four more league appearances during the duration of his loan, coming on as a sub against Górnik Zabrze, Chojniczanka Chojnice, and Miedź Legnica. He made the starting eleven for the first time with Pogoń Siedlce on 27 August 2016 in a 1-0 away defeat to Olimpia Grudziądz.

FK Partizani Tirana
In Summer 2017, Sulejmani moved to FK Partizani Tirana on a free transfer. He signed on a four-year contract. He made his Albanian Superliga debut on 4 November 2017 in a 1-0 away loss to FC Kamza. He was subbed on for Giovanni La Camera in the 85th minute.

Return to FK Renova
In July 2018, Sulejmani completed his return to FK Renova. He scored his first goal for the club between both stints on his first appearance back with the club. On 11 August 2018, Sulejmani scored in the fourth minute of a 4-3 away win over former youth club FK Rabotnički. His goal was the first of the game.

References

External links
Profile at 90minut (in Polish)

1998 births
Living people
Sportspeople from Kumanovo
Association football wingers
Macedonian footballers
North Macedonia youth international footballers
FK Milano Kumanovo players
FK Rabotnički players
FK Renova players
Legia Warsaw II players
MKP Pogoń Siedlce players
FK Partizani Tirana players
FK Makedonija Gjorče Petrov players
FC Struga players
FK Pelister players
Macedonian First Football League players
I liga players
Kategoria Superiore players
Macedonian expatriate footballers
Expatriate footballers in Poland
Macedonian expatriate sportspeople in Poland
Expatriate footballers in Albania
Macedonian expatriate sportspeople in Albania